Henry Floyd may refer to:

Henry Floyd (Jesuit) (1563–1641), English Catholic priest
Sir Henry Floyd, 5th Baronet (1899–1968), British Second World War general
Henry F. Floyd (born 1947), U.S. federal judge 
Henry Floyd (cricketer) (1793–1868), English cricketer
Sir Henry Floyd, 2nd Baronet (1793–1868), of the Floyd baronets
Sir Henry Robert Peel Floyd, 4th Baronet (1855–1915), of the Floyd baronets